20 Years In History is the fourth compilation by the German heavy metal/speed metal band Running Wild.  It is a chronological account of Running Wild with two tracks from every album up to and including The Brotherhood. "Prowling Werewolf" was formerly available on Heavy Metal Like A Hammerblow demo. "Apocalyptic Horsemen" is previously unreleased.

Track listing

Disc One

Disc Two

Personnel
Rolf Kasparek - Guitars, Vocals (all tracks)
Gerald 'Preacher' Warnecke - Guitars (tracks Disc 1: 1 - 3)
Majk Moti - Guitars (tracks Disc 1: 6, 8 - 12)
Axel Morgan - Guitars (tracks Disc 1: 13, 14 / Disc 2: 1, 2)
Thilo Hermann - Guitars (tracks Disc 2: 3 - 10)
Stephan Boriss - Bass (tracks Disc 1: 1 - 3, 6, 8)
Jens Becker - Bass (tracks Disc 1: 9 - 14) 
Thomas Smuszynski - Bass (tracks Disc 2: 1 - 10)
Peter Pichl - Bass (tracks Disc 1: 4, 5, 7 / Disc 2: 11, 12)
Wolfgang 'Hasche' Hagemann - Drums (tracks Disc 1: 1 - 3, 6, 8)
Stefan Schwarzmann - Drums (tracks Disc 1: 9, 10 / Disc 2: 1, 2)
Ian Finlay - Drums (tracks Disc 1: 11, 12)
Jörg Michael - Drums (tracks Disc 2: 3 - 8)
AC - Drums (tracks Disc 1: 13, 14)
Angelo Sasso - Drums (tracks Disc 1: 4, 5, 7 / Disc 2: 9 - 12)

References

2003 greatest hits albums
Running Wild (band) compilation albums
Noise Records compilation albums
Sanctuary Records compilation albums